Rhizothera is a bird genus in the family Phasianidae, native to Malaysia and Indonesia. They are the only genus in the tribe Rhizotherini. Established by George Robert Gray in 1841, it contains the following species:
 Long-billed partridge (Rhizothera longirostris)
 Dulit partridge (Rhizothera dulitensis)

The name Rhizothera is constructed of two Greek words: rhiza, meaning "root" and thēras, meaning "hunter".

Although their taxonomic relationships were formerly a mystery, with some taxonomists placing them with the more basal genera such as Arborophila and Xenoperdix that were formerly classified within the paraphyletic "Perdicinae" (this basal group is now known as Rollulinae), more recent phylogenetic studies place them as the sister group to the tribe Phasianini, which contains many well-known and widespread genera such as Perdix and Phasianus.

References

 
Bird genera
Taxa named by George Robert Gray
Taxonomy articles created by Polbot